Samuel Williamson was the second president of Davidson College. After graduating from the University of South Carolina, Williamson entered the ministry. He arrived at Davidson in 1839 as a professor and then was appointed as president in 1841, becoming the longest serving president of the college during the 19th century. While president, Williamson steered the college through financial uncertainty while also building the Eumenean and Philanthropic Halls.

References

External links 
Biography from the Davidson College Archives & Special Collections

Presidents of Davidson College
1795 births
1882 deaths